John Walson Sr. (1915-1993), from Mahanoy City, Pennsylvania, is recognized by the U.S. Congress and the National Cable Television Association as having invented cable TV in the spring of 1948, although this is disputed.

Biography 
Walson, owner of a Mahanoy City, Pennsylvania [General Electric appliance store, needed to solve problems receiving signals from Philadelphia television stations, which were blocked by the mountains surrounding the town. Walson erected an antenna on a utility pole on a local mountaintop that enabled him to demonstrate the televisions in his store with strong broadcasts coming from the three Philadelphia stations. He connected the antenna to his appliance store via a cable and modified signal boosters. He then connected several of his customers who were located along the cable path. This was the first community antenna television (CATV) system in the United States.

Walson's company grew over the years, and he is recognized as the founder of the cable television industry. He was also the first cable operator to use microwave to import distant television stations, the first to use coaxial cable to improve picture quality, and the first to distribute pay television programming.

His descendants now own Service Electric, which is a family-owned cable TV provider serving Pennsylvania and Northwestern New Jersey.

References

External links
  About.com Inventors

1915 births
1993 deaths
Cable television in the United States
People from Mahanoy City, Pennsylvania